Cordell Crockett (born January 21, 1965) is an American rock bass guitarist who played for the band Ugly Kid Joe from 1991 to their first breakup in 1997, and again since their reunion in 2010. He also played bass on some of the songs on Atomship's The Crash of '47.

Equipment 

Crockett uses a wide range of different bass techniques including slapping, popping, finger picking, and plectrums. He also uses a bass guitar wah-wah pedal quite frequently, particularly in the Ugly Kid Joe songs "Same Side", "Sandwich", and "Funky Fresh Country Club".

Influences
His main influence is Black Sabbath bassist Geezer Butler.  Ugly Kid Joe has covered many of their songs, including "Sweet Leaf" and "N.I.B." Other influences include Steve Harris.

References

1965 births
Living people
American rock bass guitarists
American heavy metal bass guitarists
Ugly Kid Joe members
American male bass guitarists
20th-century American bass guitarists
20th-century American male musicians